Lauren O'Rourke is a British actress best known for her roles in the sitcom Drifters as Laura on Channel 4 and as Carol in White Gold on BBC Two. She also appeared in the first series of Line of Duty in 2012.

Career
In 2011, O'Rourke starred in and wrote Welcome to The Kerryman, her one-woman comedy show. The production was staged at that years Edinburgh Festival Fringe.

Filmography

Film

Television

References

External links 

1988 births
Living people
21st-century English actresses
English film actresses
English television actresses
Place of birth missing (living people)